Emma Curtis Hopkins (September 2, 1849 – April 8, 1925 age 75) was an American spiritual teacher and leader. She was involved in organizing the New Thought movement and was a primary theologian, teacher, writer, feminist, mystic, and healer, who ordained hundreds of people, including women, at what she named (with no tie to the Christian Science church in Boston) the Christian Science Theological Seminary of Chicago. Emma Curtis Hopkins was called the "teacher of teachers" because a number of her students went on to found their own churches or to become prominent in the New Thought Movement.

Biography in Brief 
Emma Curtis Hopkins was born Josephine Emma Curtis in 1849 in Killingly, Connecticut, to Rufus Curtis and Lydia Phillips Curtis.  She worked as a secondary-school teacher, in math, science, and the languages, and married George Irving Hopkins on July 19, 1874, which, by law ended her teaching career. Their son, John Carver, was born in 1875, graduated from the merchant marine academy and died in 1905. Her husband divorced her in 1901. She discovered Christian Science in 1883 when a neighbor healed her family of a difficult respiratory illness and later broke away, teaching and healing patients a broader understanding of mental healing and mysticism until her death, in her family home, in 1925.  Hopkins is often referred to as the "Teacher of teachers" or "the mother of New Thought."  Those who studied with Hopkins included the Fillmores, founders of Unity; Ernest Holmes, founder of Religious Science; Malinda Cramer and Nona L. Brooks, founders of Divine Science; and Harriet Emilie Cady, author of Unity's cornerstone text Lessons in Truth.

Career 

Hopkins was initially a student of the Christian Science of Mary Baker Eddy, who had been healed of a long-term back condition by Phineas Parkhurst Quimby, who had discovered what he believed to be "the science of Christ," and went on to teach his "mental healing" methods around New England, Eddy claimed, after Quimby's death in 1866, to have found in the Christian Bible a science behind the alleged healing miracles of Jesus which could (as taught by Quimby and demonstrated in her own work) be practiced by anyone. Eddy went on to found the Massachusetts Metaphysical College in 1876, and Hopkins studied with her in 1883.  Hopkins would afterwards (see below) leave Christian Science to develop her own more eclectic form of metaphysical idealism, known later as New Thought with, like it, certain mystical traits of Gnosticism, Theosophy, and a wide variety of early Christian and Eastern teachings (detailed in her last book, High Mysticism.

Hopkins came to differ from Eddy in the fundamental idea of matter: where Eddy taught that "there is no intelligence in matter,"  Hopkins logically deduced that if God as Intelligence is omnipresent, then God's intelligence must be present in matter, and every other aspect of the universe.  She also moved away from Eddy's lead in speaking of God as both Mother and Father, Hopkins conceptualized the Trinity as three aspects of divinity, each playing a leading role in different historical epochs: God the Father, God the Son, and God the Mother-Spirit or Holy Comforter. Hopkins believed (as did Eddy, though not as parochially) that spiritual healing was the Second Coming of Christ into the world.  Hopkins also believed more specifically that the changing roles of women indicated their emerging prominence in the Godhead, signaling a new epoch identified by the inclusion of the Mother aspect of God.

While Phineas Parkhurst Quimby is sometimes described as the founder of New Thought, he died in 1866, leaving his notes to his students, the Dresser family, to compile and publish, which didn't happen until 1907. New Thought, therefore, did not formally organize until Hopkin's students brought together and focused the national movement, leading to the formation of the International New Thought Association in 1918, with Hopkins elected as its first president.

Her first work, Class Lessons 1888, was based on her notes from Eddy's classes, modified as she had begun teaching on her own. She went on to author a prolific body of written work (see bibliography below), which evolved with her own understanding. She was acclaimed for the giftedness of her personal lectures. Those who heard her speak noted her charismatic oratory, and many cases were documented of attendees experiencing healings during, or shortly after, attending.

Relation to Christian Science and work with Mary Plunkett 

Hopkins completed the first course of study at Eddy's Metaphysical college in December 1883, and worked as a practitioner in Boston and New Hampshire starting in February 1884. She was brought on as editor of the Christian Science Journal, then in October 1885, just over a year later, was relieved of the post—apparently for writing an editorial syncretizing too wide an Asian influence for Eddy's increasing identification with Christianity and suggesting the Mrs. Eddy was not the only mystical writer and teacher worth studying.

She had earlier criticized A.J. Swartz for plagiarism of Eddy's work in his Mind-Cure Journal but, apparently through the help of another of Eddy's students, Mary Plunkett, was asked to edit Swartz's magazine for a period during 1886, while he was out of the country. That required a move to Chicago, where Hopkins remained for the next decade.

In Chicago, Hopkins and Plunkett established the Emma Hopkins College of Christian Science and the Hopkins Metaphysical Association, appropriating the then-common term Christian Science. Hopkins and Plunkett believed the term appropriately described their work, in spite of their breach with Eddy, who by that time had changed the name of her operation to the Church of Christ, Scientist. Their first class graduated in 1886 and were, as were all Hopkins' students henceforth, enjoined to both "make these ideas your own" and "teach these principles to ensure their power in you."

Plunkett asked Eddy for a division of Eddy's Christian Science movement, with Eddy to yield everything west of the Mississippi, and then took offense at Eddy's rebuff.  Hopkins and Plunkett would in time take in other disaffected students of Eddy, such as Ursula Gestefeld, who were dissatisfied with either the teachings or Eddy's promotional methods.

Among the several hundred students who attended the college over the next 2 years were Charles and Myrtle Fillmore, who also began to use the term as they, too, began to heal others and to teach.

In 1888 Plunkett, dissatisfied with the limitations of their work in Chicago, left Hopkins and used her own past ties to Eddy to build a following in New York City. She fell into public disgrace after the scandal of her parting with her husband John, who had fathered neither of her children, in favor of a free love relationship with A. Bentley Worthington. Within a month after her adoption of his name Worthington was exposed as an embezzler and multi-state bigamist. Plunkett moved to Australia, where she committed suicide.

It was only in the late 1890s, when it became clear that Eddy was determined that only her teachings could be called Christian Science that the term was let go, by Hopkins and other students of the philosophy and methods.

The Theological Seminary 
Plunkett took with her the mailing list and other files associated with their joint venture, which left Hopkins in a difficult situation. She applied the principles and methods she taught to help her through it, and in the process realized that what she had to offer was not a profession, but a ministry. She rebounded from Plunkett's departure by launching a new journal, which she called Christian Science, and sent it to those who had studied with her to promulgate the idea of healing as a ministry, and, with the help of a local Methodist minister, founding a seminary, which focused on training spiritual leaders - especially women. Hopkins believed that mankind was supposed to live through three spiritual ages, corresponding with the Holy Trinity. God the Father represented the patriarchies of the past. God the Son represented Jesus Christ and the freeing of human thought. The present age of God the Holy Spirit would place women in charge. Hopkins thought of the Holy Spirit in terms of the Shekinah, the Mother Comforter. Her focus on women as leaders was made evident in both her creation and support of the Hopkins' Association chapters around the world and in maintaining a booth in the Women's Pavilion at the Chicago World's Fair of 1893.

She led the seminary and, with a dozen faculty, taught classes to hundreds of students, with 110 graduates becoming ordained over the years. (see list of well-known New Thought leaders, below) Then, following the graduation ceremonies of June, 1896, she abruptly shut it down.

12 Lessons 
Building on what she learned from Mrs. Eddy, Hopkins taught 12 lessons, the content of which evolved as she taught and practiced. She describes them in her early book, Scientific Mental Practice,There are twelve aspects of consciousness, represented by the twelve Apostles of the early Christian church, and you must be awake in every one. The twelve lessons herein teach us to realize them all, leaving nothing undone.

There are twelve conditions of human life that may be met with twelve truths, to be found in all religions, around the world. These twelve conditions are represented by the twelve Apostles and, when they have been met by Truth, you may be sure that your life will be free, glad, and powerful.

Mind is composed of twelve powers. When your mind exercises these twelve powers, the twelve aspects of consciousness shine like polished jewels. They make a perfect foundation for an absolute demonstration of the Spirit within each of us, and so are described in the biblical Revelation as “foundation stones.”

The first six lessons in this work describe the beautiful powers of your mind as to your own experience and judgment. The last six relate to your surroundings.

Let the mind go step by step: one lesson seems to be all, then the next takes you to another level of realization, then the next—till the twelve gates of understanding are opened.Except for compilations of her articles, Class Lessons of 1888, and High Mysticism, each of the books that has been published under Hopkins' name is a transcription of her lectures, prepared by her students, and, since Hopkins spoke without notes and in a stream of consciousness, offers a slightly different version of the principles and methods. As a result, modern readers sometimes find the material difficult to follow. For this reason, Ruth L. Miller, a New Thought minister, has "translated" some of her works into modern prose and style, under the titles Unveiling Your Hidden Power and The Spiritual Science of Emma Curtis Hopkins.

A Wandering Mystic 
For nearly 30 years after the closing of the Seminary, Hopkins traveled. She was seeking, as she said in High Mysticism, to own as little as possible and, through service to others, allow her divine Source to be her supply and protection. She wrote and lectured and offered individual healing sessions. She spent winters in New York, participating in the "season" of plays and concerts, and summers on the family farm in Connecticut. Among many other luminaries, she came to know the socialite Mabel Dodge before she married and became Mabel Dodge Lujan, and visited her in Taos, New Mexico, where Georgia O'Keeffe and D.H. Lawrence had homes.

In 1918 she was elected the first president of the newly formed International New Thought Association. There, her many students honored her for giving them the gift of New Thought healing methods, her final book, High Mysticism, was presented at that time. and a persistent young man sought an interview, but she refused—not agreeing to see him until October 1924, when he became her last student: Ernest Holmes, who went on to write The Science of Mind, as a result.

In 1923 Hopkins was diagnosed with congenital heart failure, which she called "not so much an illness as God's ending a career," and spent most of that year on the family farm. She returned to New York in the fall of 1924, where she shared her teachings with Ernest Holmes, but was back on the farm come spring. There, some of her students, members of what were once Hopkins Associations but now called the High Watch Fellowship, had bought a home across the road. They met almost daily, working through the daily practices Hopkins had described over and over in her classes and lectures. On April 8, 1925, they came to see her and she was in bed. She asked them to read her favorite Bible verses, and as they did, she breathed her last.

Influence

Among those who studied with Emma Curtis Hopkins were:
 Malinda Cramer, Nona L. Brooks, Fannie Brooks co-founders of Divine Science;
 Charles Fillmore and Myrtle Fillmore, co-founders of the Unity who were ordained by Hopkins in 1891;
 Harriet Emilie Cady, author of Lessons in Truth;
 Annie Rix Militz, founder of Home of Truth;
 Ernest Holmes, founder of Religious Science; Ordained in Divine Science
 William Walker Atkinson, prolific New Thought author.
Their students include:

 Emmet Fox, Divine Science minister in New York City through the depression and author of The Sermon on the Mount and The Power of Constructive Thought
 Florence Scovel Shinn, Unity teacher in New York City and author of The Game of Life and How to Play It.
 Louise Hay, founder of Hay House and author of You Can Heal Your Life
 Michael Bernard Beckwith, founder of Agape Center in Los Angeles and author of Spiritual Liberation
 among thousands of others....

Her ideas about spiritual healing and the soul's relationship with God have been adopted by some mainstream religious movements including the International Order of St. Luke the Physician which was founded by an Episcopal priest.

Bibliography
(This is a partial list of her work. References from www.worldcat.org and Google Books )
 A golden promise. Publisher: Pittsfield, Mass. : Sun Print. [192-]
 According to thy faith. Baccalaureate address. Bible ...
 All is divine order. Publisher: Pittsfield, Mass. : Sun Printing, 1925.
 Awake thou that sleepest. Publisher: Pittsfield, Mass. : Sun Print. [192-?]
 Bible instruction series.
 Bible interpretations. These Bible interpretations were given during the early nineties at the Christian Science theological seminary at Chicago, Illinois. Publisher: (Pittsfield, Mass., Sun Printing Co., 1925) (Available online)
 Bible interpretation from the book of Job : in three lessons. Publisher: Roseville, Calif. : High Watch Fellowship, [19--]
 Bible Interpretations Series 1–14; available online: (Series 1–3) (Series 4–6) (Series 7)
 Bible Lessons 1-35.
 Bible Lessons 1925.
 Bible lesson 1927.
 Bible lesson, no. 1. Publisher: Pittsfield, Mass. : Sun Printing, 1925–1927.
 Bible lessons. Publisher: Pittsfield, Mass., Sun Printing Co., 1925
 But one substance. Publisher: Pittsfield, Mass. : Sun Print. [192-?]
 Christ at Samaria. Publisher: Pittsfield, Mass. : Sun Printing, 1925.
 Christian mysticism and the victorious life : first study, the sacred edict and estoric discipline. Publisher: Baltimore : Williams & Wilkins Co., 1914.
 Class lessons, 1888. Publisher: Marina del Rey, Calif. : DeVorss, 1977.
 Continue the work. Publisher: Pittsfield, Mass. : Sun Print., 1925.
 Drops of gold. Publisher: Roseville, CA : High Watch Fellowship, 1970. (Available online)
 Emma Curtis Hopkins 2011. This is a reproduction of a book published before 1923.
 Esoteric Philosophy Deeper Teachings in Spiritual Science. Publisher: Vancouver, WA: WiseWoman Press, 2009 
 Esoteric philosophy in spiritual science.
 First lesson in Christian Science. Publisher: [S.l., 1888]
 For unto us a child is born. Publisher: Marina Del Rey, CA : DeVorss & Co. Publishers, [199-?] (Available online)
 The Genesis Series. Publisher: Vancouver, WA: WiseWoman Press, 2019
God and man are One. Publisher: Pittsfield, Mass. : Sun Print. [192-?]
 High mysticism. Publisher: New York : E.S. Gorham, 1924.
 High mysticism : a series of twelve studies in the inspirations of the sages of the ages. Publisher: Philadelphia, Harper Prtg. Co., 1920–22.
 High mysticism : studies in the wisdom of the sages of the ages. Publisher: Cornwall Bridge, Conn. : Emma Curtis Hopkins Fund, 1928–35.
 High mysticism : a series of twelve studies in the wisdom of the sages of the ages. Publisher: Santa Monica, Calif. : DeVorss, 1974.
 High mysticism : studies in the wisdom of the sages of the ages. Publisher: Vancouver, WA: WiseWoman Press, 2008
How to attain your good. Publisher: Kansas City, MO. : Unity Tract Society, [1898-1914]
 Jesus and Judas. Publisher: Pittsfield, Mass. : Sun Print. [19--]
 Judgment series in spiritual science. Publisher: Alhambra [Calif.] : School of Christ Teaching Sanctuary of Truth, [19--]
Judgment series in spiritual science.  Publisher: Vancouver, WA: WiseWoman Press, 2008
 Justice of Jehovah. Publisher: Pittsfield, Mass. : Sun Printing [19--]
 Magic of His name. Publisher: Pittsfield, Mass. : Sun Printing, 1927.
 Pamphlets. Publisher: Cornwall Bridge, Conn. : High Watch Fellowship, [1945]
 Résumé : practice book for the twelve chapters in High mysticism - first sent forth in 1892. Publisher: Cornwall Bridge Conn. : Emma Curtis Hopkins Fund, 1928.
 Scientific Christian mental practice : founded upon the instruction of Emma Curtis Hopkins : lesson two, "Denials of science.". Publisher: [S.l. : s.n., 19--]
 Scientific Christian mental practice. Publisher: Santa Monica, Calif. : De Vorss, 1974.
 Scientific Christian mental practice, founded upon the instruction of Emma Curtis Hopkins. Lesson one "The statement of being." Publisher: [Seattle, Metaphysical News, 193-?]
 Scientific Christian Mental Practice. Publisher: Cosimo Inc 2009.
 Self treatment. Publisher: Roseville, Calif. : High Watch Fellowship, [19--] (Available online)
 Self treatments, including the Radiant I Am..Publisher: Vancouver, WA: WiseWoman Press, 2007
Sixth lesson in Christian Science : from the private lessons. Publisher: Chicago : Purdy Pub. Co., [1887?]
 Spiritual law in the natural world. Publisher: Chicago, Purdy Pub. Co., 1894.
 Studies in high mysticism : the magia Jesu Christi. IV. Faith. Publisher: Baltimore : Williams & Wilkins, 1924.
 Teachings of Emma Curtis Hopkins. Publisher: Cornwall Bridge, Conn. : High Watch Foundation, [19--] 
 Tenth lesson in Christian science. Publisher: Chicago : Christian Science Publishing Co., 1891.
 The bread of life Publisher: Pittsfield, Mass. : Sun Print., 1925.
 The chief thought. Publisher: Pittsfield, Mass. : Sun Print., 1925.
 The gospel series in spiritual science : an uncovering of the mystic connection that underlies your own true relation with God as Christ, your own eternal self, through these lessons, you come into a fuller, richer, expression of life not dependent upon the accident of opportunity. Publisher: Alhambra, CA : School of Christ Teaching, Sanctuary of Truth, [1976?]
 The Gospel Series: Uncovering the Mystical Connection .Publisher: Vancouver, WA: WiseWoman Press, 2017
 The key to power. Publisher: Kansas City, MO. : Unity Book Company, 1895, 1894.
 The ministry of the Holy Mother. Publisher: Cornwall Bridge, Conn. : Emma Curtis Hopkins Fund (Available online)
  The radiant I am. Publisher: Cornwall Bridge, Conn. : High Watch Fellowship (Available online)
 The real kingdom. Publisher: Pittsfield, Mass. : Sun Print., 1925.
 The resurrection of Christ. Publisher: Kansas City, MO. : Unity Book Company, 1893.
 Two great lessons. Publisher: Alhambra, Calif. : Sanctuary of Truth, 1977.
 Who are drunkards. This Bible interpretation was given during the early nineties at the Christian Science Theological Seminary at Chicago, Illinois. Publisher: Pittsfield, Ma., Sun Printing Co. [n.d.]
 Your idea of God. Publisher: Pittsfield, Mass. : Sun Printing, 1927.

See also
Mary Baker Eddy
Massachusetts Metaphysical College

References

Sources
Charles Braden, Spirits in Rebellion: the Rise and Development of New Thought (Southern Methodist University Press, 1963, ISBN 978-0870740251)
 
Gail M. Harley, Women Building Chicago 1790-1990: A Biographical Dictionary (Indiana University Press, 2001).
Robert Peel, Mary Baker Eddy:  The Years of Trial, 1876-1891, The Christian Science Publishing Society, 1971, .

External links
 Emma Curtis Hopkins website by Michael Terranova
 www.highwatch.net
 Biography Emna Curtis Hopkins in Spanish Language

1849 births
1925 deaths
Writers from Connecticut
New Thought clergy
New Thought mystics
New Thought writers
American Christian mystics
American spiritual writers
American spiritual teachers
Feminist theologians
19th-century American writers
20th-century American non-fiction writers
19th-century American women writers
20th-century American women writers
19th-century Christian mystics
20th-century Christian mystics
American women non-fiction writers